Linton Rodney Townes (born November 30, 1959) is a retired American professional basketball player. He was a 6 '7" (201 cm) 190 lb (86 kg) swingman from Richmond, Virginia, he played collegiately at James Madison University from 1978 to 1982. At James Madison, he helped lead the Dukes to their first NCAA tournament in program history. He played for four National Basketball Association (NBA) teams.  He also starred in high school at Covington High School in Covington, Virginia. Covington is also the same city where fellow NBA alum Bimbo Coles was born.

After college, Townes was selected by the Portland Trail Blazers with the 10th pick in the second round of the 1982 NBA draft. In his first season (1982–83) he played 55 games for the Blazers, averaging 4.5 points and 1.2 rebounds per game. His final two seasons were split between Milwaukee Bucks, Los Angeles Clippers, and San Antonio Spurs.

After being waived from the Spurs early in the 1984–85 season and playing one season at the CBA, Townes moved to Europe and Israel  where he played the remainder of his career, notably in Germany, Spain, France and Israel before retiring in 1999. In France he played for two years for the ALM Évreux in Pro B and in Israel he played for Hapoel Tel Aviv.

Career statistics

NBA

Regular season

|-
| align="left" | 1982–83
| align="left" | Portland
| 55 || 0 || 9.4 || .449 || .360 || .737 || 1.2 || 0.6 || 0.3 || 0.1 || 4.5
|-
| align="left" | 1983-84
| align="left" | Milwaukee
| 2 || 0 || 1.0 || 1.000 || .000 || .000 || 0.0 || 0.0 || 0.0 || 0.0 || 1.0
|-
| align="left" | 1983–84
| align="left" | San Diego
| 2 || 0 || 8.5 || .429 || .000 || .000 || 0.5 || 0.5 || 0.5 || 1.0 || 3.0
|-
| align="left" | 1984–85
| align="left" | San Antonio
| 1 || 0 || 8.0 || .000 || .000 || 1.000 || 1.0 || 0.0 || 0.0 || 0.0 || 2.0
|- class="sortbottom"
| style="text-align:center;" colspan="2"| Career
| 60 || 0 || 9.1 || .440 || .360 || .750 || 1.1 || 0.5 || 0.3 || 0.1 || 4.3
|}

Playoffs

|-
| align="left" | 1982-83
| align="left" | Portland
| 6 || - || 10.0 || .481 || .333 || .857 || 0.5 || 0.8 || 0.0 || 0.0 || 5.5
|-
| align="left" | 1984–85
| align="left" | San Antonio
| 2 || 0 || 3.0 || .500 || .000 || .000 || 1.5 || 0.0 || 0.0 || 0.0 || 4.0
|- class="sortbottom"
| style="text-align:center;" colspan="2"| Career
| 8 || 0 || 8.3 || .486 || .250 || .857 || 0.8 || 0.6 || 0.0 || 0.0 || 5.1
|}

College

|-
| align="left" | 1978–79
| align="left" | James Madison
| 26 || 25 || 29.4 || .563 || - || .743 || 4.2 || 1.9 || 0.9 || 0.3 || 11.6
|-
| align="left" | 1979–80
| align="left" | James Madison
| 10 || 10 || 32.2 || .558 || - || .667 || 5.2 || 2.5 || 0.7 || 1.2 || 14.6
|-
| align="left" | 1980–81
| align="left" | James Madison
| 29 || 29 || 32.6 || .558 || - || .718 || 5.8 || 2.0 || 0.8 || 0.9 || 15.3
|-
| align="left" | 1981–82
| align="left" | James Madison
| 30 || 30 || 35.5 || .552 || - || .797 || 5.9 || 2.0 || 1.1 || 0.6 || 16.3
|- class="sortbottom"
| style="text-align:center;" colspan="2"| Career
| 95 || 94 || 32.6 || .557 || - || .749 || 5.3 || 2.0 || 0.9 || 0.7 || 14.5
|}

References

External links
NBA stats @ basketballreference.com
ACB.com Profile

1959 births
Living people
ALM Évreux Basket players
American expatriate basketball people in Germany
American expatriate basketball people in Israel
American expatriate basketball people in Spain
American men's basketball players
Basketball players from Richmond, Virginia
Bàsquet Manresa players
BSC Saturn Köln players
CB Breogán players
Gijón Baloncesto players
Hapoel Tel Aviv B.C. players
Israeli Basketball Premier League players
James Madison Dukes men's basketball players
Lancaster Lightning players
Liga ACB players
Maccabi Rishon LeZion basketball players
Milwaukee Bucks players
Portland Trail Blazers draft picks
Portland Trail Blazers players
Real Madrid Baloncesto players
San Antonio Spurs players
San Diego Clippers players
Small forwards
Tampa Bay Thrillers players